Miss Universe 2005 was the 54th Miss Universe pageant, held at the Impact Arena in Nonthaburi Province, Bangkok Metropolitan Region, Thailand on May 31, 2005.

At the end of the event, Jennifer Hawkins of Australia crowned Natalie Glebova of Canada as Miss Universe 2005. It is Canada's first victory in 23 years, and the second victory in the pageant's history.

Contestants from 81 countries and territories competed in this year's pageant. The competition was hosted by Billy Bush and Nancy O'Dell.

Background

Location and date 
Thailand publicized its bid to host the pageant on July 10, 2004, during a visit by Miss Universe 2004 Jennifer Hawkins to the country. At the time, Chile, China, and Greece were also being considered to host the event. One month later, it was announced that Bangkok had been informally selected to host the competition, at a cost of US$6.5 million. The cost was to be funded by the Thai government in an attempt to boost tourism. In October, the proposal faced difficulties when the Thai government were slow to provide the promised funds, which discouraged prospective sponsors, leading Prime Minister Thaksin Shinawatra to become personally involved to make sure that plans were not derailed. The organization awarded official hosting rights to the Matching Entertainment company in December 2004, after an unsuccessful attempt by a different company, Showcase Thailand 2005.

In February 2005, after the Thai government confirmed plans to back the pageant, the Deputy Prime Minister refuted claims that the event would be held in Khao Lak, a resort town devastated by the 2004 Indian Ocean tsunami, but confirmed that Southern Thailand would host events prior to the final competition.

Selection of participants 
Contestants from 81 countries and territories were selected to compete in the pageant. Six delegates were appointees to their position to replace the original dethroned winner.

Jana Doleželová, Miss České Republiky 2004, was originally supposed to compete at Miss Universe but did not compete after the Miss České Republiky organization lost the Miss Universe franchise license to the newly formed Česká Miss pageant. Cheryl Ankrah was originally crowned Miss Trinidad and Tobago 2005 but was dethroned after she was accused of not fulfilling her duties and becoming overweight. Although Ankrah initially got an injunction to prevent another pageant being held, a Judge overturned that and a second Miss Trinidad and Tobago pageant was held. The winner of the second pageant, who represented Trinidad and Tobago at Miss Universe, was Magdalene Walcott. Miss Hanoi-Vietnam 2005 Phạm Thu Hằng became Vietnam's representative in this year's competition after Miss Vietnam Photogenic 2004 Bùi Thị Diễm refused to compete because of her studies.

The 2005 edition saw the debut of Latvia, and the returns of Albania, Indonesia, Mauritius, Namibia, Sri Lanka, United Kingdom, US Virgin Islands, and Zambia. Indonesia and Sri Lanka last competed in 1996, Zambia in 1999, United Kingdom as Great Britain in 2000, US Virgin Islands in 2002, while the others last competed in 2003. Austria, Botswana, the Cayman Islands, Chinese Taipei, Estonia, Ghana, Saint Vincent and the Grenadines, and Sweden after their respective organizations failed to hold a national competition or appoint a delegate. Marina Rodrigues of Portugal was set to compete at Miss Universe. However, Rodrigues withdrew due to undisclosed reasons.

Results

Placements

Special awards

Best National Costume

Pageant

Format 
Same with 2003, 15 semifinalists were chosen through the preliminary competition— composed of the swimsuit and evening gown competitions and closed-door interviews. The top 15 competed in the evening gown and were narrowed down to the top 10 afterward. The top 10 competed in the swimsuit competition and were narrowed down to the top 5 afterward. The top 5 competed in the question and answer round and the final look.

Selection committee

Final telecast 
 Heidi Albertsen – Danish model, winner of Elite Model Look World Final
 Kevin S. Bright – Executive producer of Friends
 Mario Cimarro – Cuban actor
 Bryan Dattilo – Days of Our Lives actor
 Carson Kressley – Queer Eye for the Straight Guy fashion expert
 Cassie Lewis – American Model
 Louis Licari – Celebrity hairstylist
 Anne Martin – from Cover Girl and Max Factor marketing
 Porntip Nakhirunkanok – Miss Universe 1988 from Thailand
 Oleksandra Nikolayenko – Miss Ukraine Universe 2004
 Chutinant Bhirombhakdi – Executive Vice Director, Director of Boon Rawd Brewery
 Jean-Georges Vongerichten – French chef

Contestants 
81 contestants competed for the title.

Notes

References

External links
 Miss Universe official website

2005
2005 in Thailand
2005 beauty pageants
Beauty pageants in Thailand
Nonthaburi province
May 2005 events in Thailand